Mathias Thrane (born 4 September 1993) is a Danish professional footballer who plays as a midfielder for HIK.

Career
Thrane joined AaB in the summer of 2014 from Hellerup IK. He got his Danish Superliga debut on 19 July 2014 against SønderjyskE when he was substituted in for Thomas Enevoldsen in the 75th minute.

Thrane played two years in AaB before signing with the competitors from OB.

On 4 February 2019, Nykøbing FC announced the signing of Thrane. He left the club in the summer 2020.

After a spell at Faroese club B36 Tórshavn, Thrane returned to Denmark at the end of February 2022, when he signed for Næstved Boldklub. In July 2022, he returned to his former club, HIK.

References

External links
 

1993 births
Living people
Danish men's footballers
Danish expatriate men's footballers
Hellerup IK players
AaB Fodbold players
Odense Boldklub players
Nykøbing FC players
Boldklubben Frem players
B36 Tórshavn players
Næstved Boldklub players
Danish Superliga players
Danish 1st Division players
Danish 2nd Division players
Faroe Islands Premier League players
Association football midfielders
Expatriate footballers in the Faroe Islands